Ansan College of Technology (also called Ansan Technical College) is a private technical college in Ansan City, which lies south of Seoul in Gyeonggi province.    It offers degree programs in social science (including English), tourism, physical education, industrial design, engineering, and computers.  All programs place a strong emphasis on vocational outcomes.   The campus stands in Danwon-gu, not far from the massive industrial complex in Sihwa, which facilitates partnerships with local industry.  The college enrolls about 3,000 students, and employs about 55 instructors.

History

As is often the case with private institutions of higher education in South Korea, the foundation to establish the school had begun its activities a long time before the actual establishment:  the Ansan College Foundation was begun in 1979.   The school was finally opened in April 1994 as Ansan Industrial Technical College, and changed to its current name in 1998.   The first president after the founding of the college was Young Yup Cho.

See also
List of colleges and universities in South Korea
Education in South Korea

External links
 Official website 

Universities and colleges in Gyeonggi Province
Education in Ansan